This is a list of heads of government of Morocco since the formation of the post of President of the Government of Morocco in 1955, to the present day.

A total of seventeen have served as President of the Government of Morocco (not counting two periods of direct rule by the King of Morocco). Additionally, one person, Mohammed Karim Lamrani, has served on three non-consecutive occasions.

Key
Political parties

Other factions

List

Graphical timeline

Footnotes

See also
Morocco
Politics of Morocco
List of rulers of Morocco
Prime Minister of Morocco
Cabinet of Morocco
List of French residents-general in Morocco
List of Spanish high commissioners in Morocco
Lists of office-holders

External links
World Statesmen - Morocco

Morocco
Government of Morocco
Heads of state